Soft Shoes is a 1925 American drama film directed by Lloyd Ingraham and featuring Harry Carey.

Plot
As described in a film magazine review, Pat  Halahan, Sheriff of Boulder, goes to San Francisco to see the sights. He meets Faith O’Day, in league with a gang of crooks. Faith decides to go straight, and Pat with the aid of the police rounds up the gang in a last desperate encounter.

Cast

Preservation
A copy of Soft Shoes survives at Národní Filmový Archiv in Prague and was screened at San Francisco Silent Film Festival on May 31, 2018.

See also
 Harry Carey filmography

References

External links

1925 films
1925 drama films
Silent American drama films
American silent feature films
American black-and-white films
Films directed by Lloyd Ingraham
Producers Distributing Corporation films
1920s American films